Dokan Sone (born 30 October 1914, date of death unknown) was a Japanese gymnast. He competed in eight events at the 1936 Summer Olympics.

References

1914 births
Year of death missing
Japanese male artistic gymnasts
Olympic gymnasts of Japan
Gymnasts at the 1936 Summer Olympics
Place of birth missing
20th-century Japanese people